Kristel Vourna (born 11 February 1992) is a Greek swimmer. At the 2012 Summer Olympics in London, she competed in the Women's 100 metre butterfly. She took the 12th place overall, finishing 7th in the second semifinal in the 100 metre butterfly with a Greek record of 58.31 seconds. She also swam the anchor leg of Greece's 4 x 100 freestyle relay, but the team failed to qualify for the final, finishing in the 16th place.

At the 2012 European Championships in Debrecen, she took the 5th place in 100 metre butterfly, the 6th place in 50 metre butterfly and the 5th place in 4 x 100 freestyle relay.

At the 2016 Summer Olympics, she competed in the women's 100 metre butterfly event where she finished 22nd in the heats and did not advance.

Honours

References

Greek female swimmers

Living people
Sportspeople from Patras
Greek female butterfly swimmers
Greek female freestyle swimmers
Olympic swimmers of Greece
Swimmers at the 2012 Summer Olympics
Swimmers at the 2016 Summer Olympics
Mediterranean Games medalists in swimming
Mediterranean Games silver medalists for Greece
Swimmers at the 2013 Mediterranean Games
Swimmers at the 2018 Mediterranean Games
1992 births